A Musical War of Love is a 1953 West German comedy film directed by Karl Hartl and starring Marte Harell, Johannes Heesters and Paul Kemp. It was shot at the Bavaria Studios in Munich. The film's sets were designed by the art director Hans Ledersteger and Ernst Richter.

Cast
 Marte Harell as Doctor Käthe Nimrod
 Johannes Heesters as Ralph Beyron
 Paul Kemp as Professor Melchior Quint
 Ernst Waldow as Direktor Winkelmann
 Ingrid Pan as Irmgard Schmuck
 Rudolf Platte as Scharnagl
 Peer Schmidt as Carlo Linetti
 Wilfried Seyferth as Generaldirektor Rabenfuß
 Viktoria von Ballasko as Fräulein Canisius
 Claus Biederstaedt as Rautenkranz
 Eugen Dumont as Justizrat
 Adi Lödel as Stift Toni
 Lina Sand

References

Bibliography 
 John Holmstrom. The Moving Picture Boy: An International Encyclopaedia from 1895 to 1995. Michael Russell, 1996.

External links 
 

1953 films
1953 musical comedy films
German musical comedy films
West German films
1950s German-language films
Films directed by Karl Hartl
Films shot at Bavaria Studios
German black-and-white films
1950s German films